The Phipps Site (13CK21) is a Late Prehistoric Mill Creek culture archaeological site near Cherokee in Cherokee County, Iowa, United States.  Its principal feature, a refuse midden, has yielded important information on the formation of middens in the region.  The site was declared a National Historic Landmark in 1964.

Description
Evidence of habitation has also been found in the form of depressions, a feature associated with earth lodges, semi-subterranean dwellings typical of the Mill Creek culture. Finds at the site include pottery fragments from both the Early and Late Little Sioux phases of the Mill Creek culture, and significant assemblages of the remains of raptors, suggesting some sort of ritual importance. The site also has artifacts attributed to the Middle Mississippian culture, evidence of a fairly long-range trading network.

The site underwent excavation in the 1930s, and again in 1952 under the auspices of Cherokee's Sanford Museum and the Iowa Archaeological Society.  It was excavated by the University of Iowa in 1955 and 1956, and has since then been subject to further investigation.  The site is subject to erosion, and was damaged during flooding in 1993.

See also
Earth sheltering
Mound
Mound builder (people)
Earthwork (archaeology)
List of National Historic Landmarks in Iowa
National Register of Historic Places listings in Cherokee County, Iowa

References

 Alex, Lynn (2000) Iowa's Archaeological Past. University of Iowa Press. pp. 153–167.
 Fishel, Richard L. (1995) Excavations at the Phipps Site (13CK21): New Perspectives on Mill Creek Culture. Office of the State Archaeologist, University of Iowa, Iowa City.

Mounds in Iowa
Native American history of Iowa
Woodland period
National Historic Landmarks in Iowa
Archaeological sites on the National Register of Historic Places in Iowa
National Register of Historic Places in Cherokee County, Iowa
Geography of Cherokee County, Iowa
Cherokee, Iowa